The Two River is a  tributary of the Mississippi River in Morrison County, Minnesota, United States. It is formed by the confluence of the North Two River and South Two River south of Bowlus, Minnesota.

Two River is an English translation of the native Ojibwe language name.

See also
List of rivers of Minnesota

References

Minnesota Watersheds
USGS Geographic Names Information Service
USGS Hydrologic Unit Map - State of Minnesota (1974)

Rivers of Minnesota
Tributaries of the Mississippi River
Rivers of Morrison County, Minnesota